Joseph Shepard is an American academic administrator serving as the 15th president of Western New Mexico University. Appointed on April 27, 2011, he assumed office on July 5, 2011.

Education 
Shepard earned a Bachelor of Science degree in math education from Northern Arizona University, Master of Business Administration in finance and banking from the University of North Texas, and a PhD in public administration from Florida International University.

Career 
Prior to serving as the president of Western New Mexico University, Shepard worked as an administrator at Florida Gulf Coast University, where he served as chief student affairs officer, chief business Officer, and chief financial officer. As president of Western New Mexico University, Shepard is responsible for the university's main campus in Silver City, New Mexico and three additional satellite locations. In September 2019, Shepard's contract was extended for three years by the university's board of regents.

References 

Living people
Northern Arizona University alumni
University of North Texas alumni
Florida International University alumni
Florida Gulf Coast University faculty
Western New Mexico University faculty
American academic administrators
Year of birth missing (living people)